Przylesie may refer to the following places:
Przylesie, Greater Poland Voivodeship (west-central Poland)
Przylesie, Opole Voivodeship (south-west Poland)
Przylesie, Pomeranian Voivodeship (north Poland)
Przylesie, Warmian-Masurian Voivodeship (north Poland)